Pat Laughlin may refer to:

 Pat Laughlin, comic fan who named the Fawcett Comics character Tawky Tawny
 Pat Laughlin, a character played by John Belushi in the TV movie Who Killed Atlanta's Children?

See also
 Pat McLaughlin, singer and songwriter
 Pat McLaughlin (baseball) player
 Pat McLaughlin (footballer)